Zoora (Syriac: ܙܥܘܪܐ, Zeʿora; Greek Ζωόρας, Zooras) was a Syrian Miaphysite monk and stylite in the Roman Empire. He moved to Constantinople in the early 530s and was condemned at the Council of Constantinople in 536. He died a few years later.

Zoora's life is known mainly from the hagiography written by his contemporary, John of Ephesus, who probably met him in Constantinople around 536. The first part of it is missing. Zoora hailed from the region around Amida. He was short in stature and his name means "small" in Syriac. He received his spiritual training under a certain Habib. Sometime before the Hunnic invasion of 515, during the reign of Anastasius I, he ascended a pillar.

Zoora remained a stylite through at least to the end of the reign of Justin I (died 527). He was forced to descend by the Chalcedonians. He went to Constantinople early in the reign of Justin's successor, Justinian I. By this time he was renowned locally and arrived in Constantinople with an entourage of ten disciples. He had a stormy interview with Justinian, during which he cursed the emperor for persecuting the faithful (i.e., the Miaphysites) and the emperor reminded him that he had proclaimed the death penalty for all who cursed the Council of Chalcedon. Although his theological rivals initially feared his eloquence, they came to regard him as entirely ignorant of the Bible. He probably had little or no formal education; his spiritual authority and parrhesia (forthrightness) stemmed from his strict asceticism.

Justinian's Miaphysite empress, Theodora, intervened to protect Zoora. When Justinian suffered from swelling, she had the monk pray for him, which supposedly healed him. She established him in the posh district of Sykai, where he officiated at baptisms and celebrated the Miaphysite liturgy, otherwise illegal in the empire. For this reason he was identified as a priest at the council of 536. He also reportedly set up 100 tables a day to feed the poor, which contributed immensely to his popularity. He baptised even some children of the Imperial Guards.

John of Ephesus claimed that the fame of Zoora drew Pope Agapetus I to Constantinople in 536. Whatever the case, the pope consented to the deposition of the Miaphysite patriarch Anthimus I, confirmed the orthodoxy of Justinian's declaration of faith and consecrated a new patriarch, Mennas. According to John, the pope's sudden death on April 22 was a result of a curse placed on him by Zoora. Mennas called a council to meet in August and on August 13, in response to the council's concerns, Justinian banned Zoora and the other heretics from Constantinople. The monk did not immediately leave, but he eventually moved to Dercus in Thrace.

At Dercus, Zoora was joined by the deposed Patriarch Theodosius of Alexandria in 537. Theodora soon had both of them moved into the Palace of Hormisdas. The date of his death is unknown.

Many miracles were attributed to Zoora after his death. In the Syriac Orthodox Church, he is regarded as a saint. His feast may be celebrated on 16 March, 11 May, 1 October or 8 October. In the 7th century, there was a church at Amida dedicated to Zoora. There were also many monasteries dedicated to him as far away as Palestine, which Justinian ordered closed after the council of 536.

Notes

References

Bibliography

Stylites
Syriac Orthodox Church saints
6th-century Byzantine monks
6th-century Christian saints
People of Roman Syria
Ancient Christians involved in controversies
6th-century people